Route 245 is a collector road in the Canadian province of Nova Scotia. Route 245 is part of the Sunrise Trail.

The route spans Pictou and Antigonish counties and connects Sutherlands River at Exit 27 on Highway 104 with Antigonish at Trunk 4.

Communities
Sutherlands River
Egerton
Merigomish
Lower Barney's River
Doctors Brook
Malignant Cove
Maryvale
Antigonish

Parks
Arisaig Provincial Park

History

The entirety of Collector Highway 245 was once designated as Trunk Highway 45.

See also
List of Nova Scotia provincial highways

References

245
245
245
Antigonish, Nova Scotia